Anes Omerovic (born 20 May 1998) is an Austrian footballer playing as a midfielder for Vaduz, based in Liechtenstein and playing in the Swiss league system. He is of Bosnian descent.

Club career
On 18 June 2021 he returned to Dornbirn.

On 7 January 2022, Omerovic signed with Vaduz in the Swiss Challenge League until June 2024.

Career statistics

Club

Notes

References

1998 births
Living people
Austrian footballers
Austria youth international footballers
Association football midfielders
FK Austria Wien players
FC Dornbirn 1913 players
FC Winterthur players
FC Vaduz players
Austrian expatriate sportspeople in Liechtenstein
Expatriate footballers in Liechtenstein
Austrian Regionalliga players
2. Liga (Austria) players
Swiss Challenge League players
Austrian expatriate footballers
Expatriate footballers in England
Austrian expatriate sportspeople in England
Expatriate footballers in Switzerland
Austrian expatriate sportspeople in Switzerland